Chris Beard (born August 29, 1957) is an American electric blues singer, guitarist, and songwriter. He has released five albums to date, the first of which was nominated for a Blues Music Award. He is dubbed 'Prince of the Blues'.

Life and career
Beard was born in Rochester, New York, United States, the son of Joe Beard, a local blues musician. Inspired by Buddy Guy and Matt Murphy, Beard quickly graduated from learning to play the guitar to performing with a local rhythm and blues group by his mid-teens. He played alongside his father before forming his own group after his graduation. Beard played in the blues clubs around his home state for almost twenty years.

Beard's debut album was Barwalkin''', issued by JSP in June 1997. Produced by Johnny Rawls, it garnered Beard a nomination for a Blues Music Award for 'Best New Blues Artist'. In 1999, Blues Beat magazine gave Beard the Muddy Waters Award as the 'New Talent of the Year'. A further album, Born to Play the Blues, followed in April 2001, and then Live Wire (2005). Referring to the latter, the Allmusic journalist, Chris Nickson, stated "Beard cements his stature with this record, and sets himself up to take a place among the contemporary blues guitar greats.

Beard has appeared at the Boundary Waters Blues Festival.

In August 2010, Beard released Who I Am and What I Do'' on Electro Glide Records. The album contained three tracks Beard co-wrote with Ronnie Baker Brooks.

Discography

See also
List of electric blues musicians

References

External links
Official website

1957 births
Living people
American blues singers
American male singers
American blues guitarists
American male guitarists
Electric blues musicians
Songwriters from New York (state)
Singers from New York (state)
Musicians from Rochester, New York
Guitarists from New York (state)
20th-century American guitarists
20th-century American male musicians
JSP Records artists
Northern Blues Music artists
American male songwriters